Arthur Abrahams) is a semi-retired Australian race car driver. He won the 1987, 1991 and 1993  Australian Formula 2 Championships driving a Cheetah Mk8, Ransburg Cheetah and Reynard 913 respectively. he also won the Australian group C touring car endurance championship (1600cc) in 1984. He competed in International Sportscars in Europe and in American open wheel racing cars. He also competed in Formula Brabham/Holden for three years, debuting in 1994 and leaving the category in 1996. He was owner of the NRC International team in Formula Holden before running Dale Brede amongst others in V8 Supercar's Development Series. In 2001 Abrahams stepped away from the sport to focus on his and family business interests.

Career results

Complete World Sportscar Championship results
(key) (Races in bold indicate pole position) (Races in italics indicate fastest lap)

Indy Lights results

References

External links
NRC International racing

Australian racing drivers
1955 births
Indy Lights drivers
Australian Formula 2 drivers
Formula Holden drivers
Living people
World Sportscar Championship drivers
Australian Endurance Championship drivers